Sir Colin Alexander St John ("Sandy") Wilson, FRIBA, RA, (14 March 1922 – 14 May 2007) was an English architect, lecturer and author. He spent over 30 years progressing the project to build a new British Library in London, originally planned to be built in Bloomsbury and now completed near Kings Cross.

Early and private life
Wilson was born in Cheltenham, the younger son of Henry Wilson, a Church of England clergyman who became Bishop of Chelmsford from 1929.  His father was known as the "Red Bishop" as a result of his sympathy for the Republican cause in the Spanish Civil War.  Wilson was educated at Felsted School, and he studied history and then architecture at Corpus Christi College, Cambridge from 1940 to 1942, when he joined the Royal Navy Volunteer Reserve. He served as a lieutenant in a Communication Squadron of the Fleet Air Arm in Europe during the Second World War and then India.  He was demobilised in 1946, he completed his studies under Sir Albert Richardson at the Bartlett School of Architecture at University College London, graduating as an architect in 1949.

Wilson married twice.  First he married Muriel Lavender in 1955, but they were later divorced in 1971. Then he married the American-born architect Mary Jane Long, a founding partner of Long & Kentish architects, in 1972; with Long together he had one son and one daughter. Long and Wilson often collaborated on design projects.

Career
After graduating, he worked at the London County Council architects department from 1950 to 1955, under the directorship of Sir Leslie Martin, alongside James Stirling, Alison and Peter Smithson, Alan Colquhoun, Peter Carter, and William Howell.  His designs of this period include the Le Corbusier-inspired Bentham Road Estate, Hackney. Wilson was involved with the Independent Group of artists at the Institute of Contemporary Arts in London, and he contributed to the seminal "This Is Tomorrow" exhibition at the Whitechapel Art Gallery in 1956. He worked for a development company for a year before becoming a lecturer in architecture at Cambridge University in 1956, where Martin had been appointed Professor of Architecture.  Wilson met Finnish architect Alvar Aalto through Martin and this had a major impact on his following building.  He was a Fellow at Churchill College, Cambridge, from 1962 to 1971.  He retired from teaching in 1969 to 
concentrate on his architectural practice.

As well as teaching together, Wilson and Martin also practised together as architects from offices in Cambridge, designing Harvey Court at Gonville and Caius College, Cambridge, which himself argues had an influence on Italian rationalist architecture, especially that of Aldo Rossi, an extension to the School of Architecture in Cambridge, a house for painter Christopher Cornford in Cambridge, and the Law, English and Statistical Libraries on Manor Road in Oxford, and other buildings in Cambridge and London.  Wilson designed his own home in Cambridge on Grantchester Road.  He was commissioned to design the proposed Liverpool Civic and Social Centre, but the building was never finished, being deemed "fascist" by the council.  He also designed an extension for the British Museum which was also never realised.

In terms of architectural production, Wilson is best known for designing the current British Library building in London, begun in 1962 and finally completed – after a 35-year history of political wrangles, budget overspending and design problems – in 1997.  He described it as his "30-year war".  The original scheme would have created a piazza to the south of the British Museum in Bloomsbury, but would have required the demolition of a large part of Bloomsbury.  After a public protest, a new site was found further north, between Euston Station and St Pancras Station.  A design was approved in 1978, but then delayed by the change of government after the 1979 general election, and ambitions were reduced amid rising costs.  The architecture of the huge building is influenced by several sources: the surrounding Victorian architecture in the St Pancras area of London and the collegiate architecture of Cambridge University. The use of finely detailed brickwork, multi-layer terraces, interplay of pitched roof elements and gradual stepping up of the entrance are all direct references to Aalto, in particular his Säynätsalo Town Hall. The entrance area features pendant lamps designed by the Finnish architect Juha Leiviskä, whom Wilson knew personally. The building was shortlisted for the RIBA Stirling Prize in 1998.

Wilson returned to Cambridge to become Professor of Architecture in 1975, stepping into shoes vacated by the early death of William Howell.  He was a Fellow at Pembroke College, Cambridge, from 1977 to his death in 2007.  He retired in 1989, becoming a professor emeritus.  He became a trustee of the Tate Gallery in 1974, and a trustee of the National Gallery in 1977, retiring from both positions in 1980.  He was a member of the Royal Institute of British Architects and the Royal Academy. He was knighted in 1998 for services to architecture, and was an Honorary Fellow at Churchill College from 1998 to 2007.  He received honorary doctorates from the universities of Cambridge, Essex and Sheffield.  He was a visiting professor at Yale four times (1960, 1964, 1983 and 2000) and at MIT from 1970 to 1972.

He published two theoretical works, Architectural Reflections in 1992 and The Other Tradition of Modern Architecture in 1995, and The Artist at Work, on Michael Andrews and William Coldstream, in 1999.

More recently, Wilson and Long & Kentish designed the new wing of Pallant House Gallery in Chichester, England, which opened in June 2006.  The unashamedly modern block stands next to the original gallery, housed in a Grade 1 listed Queen Anne townhouse, was shortlisted for RIBA awards in 2007, and won the 2007 Gulbenkian Prize. Wilson also donated his share of his collection of over 400 works of art to the gallery (owned jointly with his second wife).  His collection, worth £5m, included works by Michael Andrews, Victor Willing, Peter Blake, David Bomberg, Patrick Caulfield, Lucian Freud, Richard Hamilton, R. B. Kitaj, Eduardo Paolozzi and Walter Sickert.  Many of the works were acquired directly from the artists, who were friends of Wilson: indeed, he designed homes for several.

An extension to the British Library opened in 2007, shortly before his death. He was survived by his second wife, and their son and daughter.

He is buried on the east side of Highgate Cemetery.

National Life Stories conducted an oral history interview (C467/17) with Colin St John Wilson in 1996 for its Architects Lives' collection held by the British Library.

See also

References 

Obituary, The Guardian, 16 May 2007
Obituary, The Daily Telegraph, 16 May 2007
Obituary, The Times, 17 May 2007
 Obituary, The Independent, 19 May 2007
Biography from Pallant House Gallery

Further reading 
Colin St John Wilson "The Other Tradition of Modern Architecture: The Uncompleted Project" Black Dog Publishing, 1995, 2007
Colin St John Wilson "The Artist at Work: On the Working Methods of William Coldstream and Michael Andrews" Lund Humphries, 1999 	
Roger Stonehouse, Eric Parry "Colin St John Wilson: Buildings and Projects" Black Dog Publishing, 2007
Sarah Menin, Stephen Kite "An Architecture of Invitation: Colin St John Wilson" Ashgate, 2005

External links 
 
Pallant House Gallery
The Wilson Collection
A selection of the works donated by Wilson
British Library's architect dies, BBC News, 15 May 2007
Biography from the Royal Academy
Portrait at the National Portrait Gallery
Statement on British Library website

20th-century English architects
1922 births
People educated at Felsted School
Alumni of Corpus Christi College, Cambridge
Alumni of The Bartlett
Fellows of Churchill College, Cambridge
Fellows of Pembroke College, Cambridge
People from Cheltenham
2007 deaths
Burials at Highgate Cemetery
Knights Bachelor
Fellows of the Royal Institute of British Architects
Royal Academicians
Royal Naval Volunteer Reserve personnel of World War II
British Library
21st-century English architects
Architects from Gloucestershire
Fleet Air Arm personnel of World War II
20th-century English male writers